Litochovice is a municipality and village in Strakonice District in the South Bohemian Region of the Czech Republic. It has about 300 inhabitants.

Administrative parts
Villages of Neuslužice and Střítež are administrative parts of Litochovice.

References

Villages in Strakonice District